Manuel de Andrade Fulano de Tal (b. in São Jorge), was an Azorean jurist.  He was also a comarta of Velas and a publisher of the review known as Jorgense.

References

Memória da Visita Régia à Ilha Terceira (Memories Of The Royal Visit Of Terceira Island), edited by Alfredo Luís Campos.  Imprensa Municipal, Angra do Heroísmo, 1903.

Azorean writers
People from São Jorge Island
Azorean jurists
Year of birth missing
Year of death missing